Highland Park Middle School can refer to:
 Highland Park Middle School (Texas) in Highland Park, Texas, part of the Highland Park Independent School District
 Highland Park Middle School in St. Paul, Minnesota, part of St. Paul Public Schools
 Highland Park Middle School in Highland Park, New Jersey, part of the Highland Park Public School District
 Highland Park Middle School in Beaverton, Oregon, part of the Beaverton School District